Hassan Bin Muhamad Bin Shehata Bin Mousa al-Anani, known as Sheikh Hassan Shehata (November 10, 1946 - June 23, 2013) was an ex-Sunni, who later converted to Shia Islam, scholar who was killed in the small village of Zawyat Abu Musalam in Giza by a Salafi inspired and encouraged mob. He studied at Egypt's al-Azhar University and in the 1970s, served as a prominent Sunni Imam to the Egyptian Army. According to his own account, after having a dream of Imam Ali and other sahaba, he converted to Shia Islam in the 1990s. In 2009, he spent some time in jail under the government of ousted Egyptian president Hosni Mubarak due to his speeches against radical, fundamentalist Sunni movements that harm Islam. 306 of his followers were also detained along with him. In the gruesome lynching on June 23, 2013, an angry mob led by the country's Salafist sheikhs torched Shia residences in the small village of Zawyat Abu Musalam in Giza governorate, killing four citizens, including Shehata, a prominent cleric who was visiting one of the families in the village when the attack took place. He served as a prominent Shia cleric who had thousands of followers due to his moderate views and his denouncement of radical and extremist movements in Egypt. On June 13, 2015, an Egyptian court sentenced 23 people to 14 years in prison for the fatal lynching of four Shia men in the village of Abu Musallim. The court acquitted eight other defendants.

See also
 Shia Islam in Egypt

References

External links 
 Human Rights Watch: Egypt: Lynching of Shia Follows Months of Hate Speech

Egyptian Shia clerics
Egyptian Shia Muslims
1946 births
2013 deaths
Converts to Shia Islam from Sunni Islam
Critics of Sunni Islam
Critics of Islamism
Egyptian murder victims
People from Sharqia Governorate
Al-Azhar University alumni